"The Robbery" is the third episode of the first season of the NBC sitcom Seinfeld.

It aired as the third episode of the season on June 7, 1990. It was written by Matt Goldman, making this the first Seinfeld episode not written by the show's creators, Jerry Seinfeld and Larry David.

In the episode, Jerry leaves Elaine in charge of his apartment while he goes on tour. When he returns, he finds the apartment has been robbed after Kramer left the front door open. While Kramer promises to find the robbers, George offers him the chance to move into a much better apartment—a move he accepts, allowing Elaine to move into Jerry's apartment and away from her annoying roommate Tina.

Plot
Jerry goes away to perform some stand-up in Minneapolis, leaving Elaine to look after his apartment. Elaine is having trouble with an annoying roommate, Tina, who is a "Waitress/Actress" hoping to get a part, and asks George if he can find her some new accommodation. She then tries to persuade Jerry to give her his current apartment, with George offering Jerry a new apartment on West 83rd Street by Central Park which he claims is great. Jerry turns the offer down. When Jerry returns he finds the apartment has been burglarized because Kramer left the front door open by mistake. As a way of making up, Kramer promises to find the items that were stolen from Jerry.

After the robbery, Jerry agrees to have a look at the new apartment. The apartment is great and Jerry takes it, allowing Elaine to move into the old apartment. Jerry is about to sign the lease to the apartment, but George tells him that if he was having second thoughts, he should not take it. Realizing that George wants the new apartment for himself, Jerry gambles with him for the apartment and wins. Meanwhile, Kramer thinks he knows where Jerry's stolen objects are, and suspects an Englishman along the hallway who denies having any "stuff" on him.

Later in Monk's Café, Jerry goes back on the deal and decides not to take the place because George wants it. The two continue to argue about who should own it, and decide that neither of them should take it. A waitress, Carolyn, played by Anita Wise, overhears them and George offers the place to her. The waitress invites them and Elaine to her housewarming, but Jerry, George, and Elaine regret that Jerry didn't take the new apartment. They overhear two people having a conversation about someone else moving out of their apartment, to which all three ask what the apartment's rent is.

Production
"The Robbery" was written by Matt Goldman, making this episode the first not to be written by Jerry Seinfeld or Larry David and the only one not written by Seinfeld and David for the first production season. The idea for the episode was inspired by Seinfeld's own experiences of his apartment being robbed when he was a student, although rather than the door being unlocked as it was in the episode, the burglars broke through the walls. David was given a $20,000 bonus by Castle Rock and was promoted to executive producer for his work on the episode. During the shooting of the episode, an earthquake struck the set, but no one was hurt.

The episode is the first to mention the character of Tina, Elaine's actress roommate, although she does not appear in this episode. It is also the first episode to feature Kramer making a sliding entrance into Jerry's apartment, which became a trademark in all the later episodes. Carolyn the waitress, played by Anita Wise, and her husband Larry, are named after Seinfeld's own sister and brother-in-law.

In the original draft of the script, the Englishman is called "Berbick." In the same script, Elaine asks Jerry what happened between Kramer and the Englishman. Jerry replies, "Kramer stayed there three hours. They're like best friends now."

Reception
When "The Robbery" first aired on June 7, 1990, it received a Nielsen rating of 13.6/24. This means that the episode was watched by 13.6% of American households, and that 24% of all televisions in use at the time were tuned into it.

Reviews of the episode were mixed. Andy Patrizio from IGN.com wrote that "The Robbery" was the best episode of the first season of Seinfeld, saying that it showed "the dynamics that would come to define the show." However, Colin Jacobson for DVD Movie Guide said, "It lacks the great banter and play that marks the best episodes, but it doesn't come across as a total dud. It just seems a bit uninspired in the greater scheme of things."

References

External links
 The Robbery at the official Seinfeld site.
  at the Internet Movie Database

Seinfeld (season 1) episodes
1990 American television episodes